Jim Paterson "Jumbo" Muir (born 30 January 1949) is a former footballer who played as centre forward for Motherwell and as centre half for Dumbarton. He later played in Australia, representing the Australia national soccer team five times.

Playing career

Club career
Muir played junior football for Irvine Victoria, before joining Motherwell. He played 110 times between 1967 and 1975, before joining Dumbarton. At Dumbarton, Muir played 114 times before leaving to play in Australia. He joined Adelaide City, playing 29 times between 1978 and 1980.

During the 1980 National Soccer League season, Muir transferred to Marconi. After the 1981 season, Muir transferred to Eastern in Hong Kong for a  transfer fee.

International career
Despite not holding Australian citizenship, Muir was selected to play for the Australia national soccer team in 1980. He played five times for Australia in full international matches, all in 1980.

References

1949 births
Scottish footballers
Dumbarton F.C. players
Motherwell F.C. players
Scottish Football League players
Living people
Association football forwards
Australia international soccer players
Adelaide City FC players
Eastern Sports Club footballers
Marconi Stallions FC players